Merley Cobham Sports Football Club is a football club based in Merley, in Poole, Dorset, England. The club is affiliated to the Dorset County Football Association and is a FA chartered Standard club.

History
The club was established in 1949 as Flight Refuelling F.C. and played in the local Dorset leagues. The club managed to work its way up the leagues and joined the Dorset Combination league for the start of the 1958–59 season. However, they only lasted two seasons in the league and had to wait until the 1977–78 season. Their first season back in the Dorset Combination league was a complete success as they finished the season as champions. Four seasons later in the 1980–81 campaign, the club made their debut in the FA Vase and continued playing in the competition until the end of the 1994–95 season when new ground regulations stopped them entering the competition. They changed their name to Cobham Sports F.C. in 2001.

At the start of the 2010–11 season the club merged with Merley Allendale Youth FC, and changed their name to Merley Cobham Sports F.C. In May 2012, the club was awarded its FA chartered Standard.

Ground

Merley Cobham Sports play their home games at Cobham Sports & Social Club, Merley Park, Wimborne, BH21 3DA.

Honours

League honours
Dorset Premier Football League :
 Winners (1): 1977–78
 Runners-up (3): 1987–88, 1989–90, 1990–91

Cup honours
Dorset Premier Football League Cup:
 Winners (3): 1979–80, 1982–83, 1990–91
 Runners Up (3): 1981–82, 1985–86, 2010–11

Records
Highest League Position: 1st in Dorset Premier Football League 1977–78
FA Vase best performance: First Round 1980–81, 1983–84, 1985–86

References

External links

Association football clubs established in 1949
Football clubs in Dorset
1949 establishments in England
Football clubs in England
Dorset Premier Football League